Jagath is both a given name and a surname. Notable people with the name include:

Jagath Jayasuriya, Sri Lankan Army general
Jagath Balasuriya, Sri Lankan politician
Jagath Wickramasinghe, Sri Lankan musician
Bandula Jagath, Sri Lankan cricketer
A. P. Jagath Pushpakumara, Sri Lankan politician
Jagath Chamila, Sri Lankan actor

Sinhalese masculine given names